On 9 October 2015, Prashanth Poojary, a Hindu man from the town of Moodabidri in Dakshina Kannada,Karnataka, was killed by Muslim extremists.

Poojary, a 29 year old flower seller and a member of Bajrang Dal, was stabbed with blades by six assailants at about 7.00 am IST. , ten people have been arrested in connection with the attack, allegedly motivated by Poojary's activism against the illegal slaughter of cows. One suspect Mohammad Imtiaz Gantalkatte was arrested from Mumbai airport as he was attempting to flee India for Dubai.

An eyewitness to the incident 60 year old Vaman Poojary, a tender coconut seller whose shop was opposite Poojary's shop, went missing on 15 October 2015. He was found dead on the next day. It has been alleged by Nalin Kumar Kateel MP from Dakshina Kannada constituency to which the town of Moodabidri belongs that witnesses were being threatened over international phone calls including those made from Pakistan and asked not to testify against the suspects. The Karnataka government also revealed that its minister Abhayachandra Jain received threats Karnataka police consider this murder as a part of a conspiracy to incite communal hatred in the region.

A Zee News talk show titled "Cow slaughter: Protests against Dadri lynching, why silence over Prashanth Poojary's murder?" commented on the absence of media attention as regards to the murder. Vishwesha Teertha head of the Sri Pejavara Adokshaja Matha has similarly asserted bias on the part of a section of writers for their selective outrage to criminal incidents exemplified by their silence on Poojary's killing.

Aftermath
One Mohammed Imtiyaz (Accused in the murder of Prashanth Poojary & accused in several illegal cattle transport cases) a resident of Kallabettu in Moodbidri was attacked a little after 6 AM by a group of nine, at a hotel in Moodbidri. The nine accused in this case are yet to be identified.

Shortly after the attack, a photograph surfaced of Karnataka Legislative Assembly Member and politician for the Indian National Congress, Abhaychandra Jain, with one of the accused in the murder.

See also

 Murder of Lalit Jain
 Kamlesh Tiwari
 Murder of Kanhaiya Lal
 Murder of Samuel Paty

References

2015 deaths
2015 murders in India
Deaths by blade weapons
Deaths by stabbing in India